Bansgadhi is a municipality in the Bardiya District in southwestern Nepal.

Bansgadhi was established on 2 December 2014. 
The city covers 206 square kilometers and is located in Terai, 20 kilometers north of Nepalganj. The highway Mahendra Rajmarg runs through Bansgadhi.

Demographics
At the time of the 2011 Nepal census, Bansgadhi Municipality had a population of 55,875. Of these, 50.0% spoke Nepali, 46.1% Tharu, 1.5% Awadhi, 0.7% Urdu, 0.5% Hindi, 0.3% Magar, 0.2% Maithili, 0.2% Raji, 0.2% Newar and 0.3% other languages as their first language.

In terms of ethnicity/caste, 46.6% were Tharu, 18.1% Chhetri, 10.4% Hill Brahmin, 8.0% Kami, 4.8% Thakuri, 3.5% Magar, 2.3% Damai/Dholi, 1.3% Yadav, 1.3% Musalman and 3.7% others.

In terms of religion, 96.5% were Hindu, 1.6% Christian, 1.3% Muslim and 0.6% Buddhist.

References 

Cities in Nepal
Populated places in Bardiya District
Municipalities in Lumbini Province
Nepal municipalities established in 2014
Municipalities in Bardiya District